Scratch is a Canadian musical drama film from Quebec, released in 2015. The directorial debut of Sébastien Godron, the film centres on a family of Haitian Canadian immigrants in Montreal's Little Burgundy neighbourhood. The primary characters are Angelot/"Leslie" (Raphaël Joseph Lafond), an aspiring hip hop musician, and his brother Frantz (Fayolle Jean, Jr.), a pimp who sets the film's events in motion when he is arrested and imprisoned.

The cast also includes Schelby Jean-Baptiste, Samian, Lovhard Dorvilliers, Dominique Laguë (vocal percussionist) and Fayolle Jean (Sr.).

At the 4th Canadian Screen Awards in 2016, Jenny Salgado won the award for Best Original Song, for "C’est aujourd’hui que je sors". At the 18th Quebec Cinema Awards, the film garnered nominations for Best Supporting Actress (Schelby Jean-Baptiste), Best Editing (Hubert Hayaud) and Best Original Music (Jenny Salgado, André Courcy and Luc St-Pierre).

References

External links 
 

2015 films
Canadian musical drama films
Quebec films
Black Canadian films
Films set in Montreal
Haitian Quebecers
2010s musical drama films
2015 drama films
French-language Canadian films
2010s Canadian films